This article lists the largest companies in Germany in terms of their revenue, net profit and total assets, according to the American business magazines Fortune, Forbes and GlobalDatabase.

2022 GlobalDatabase list 
List of 30 Top German companies by GlobalDatabase, ranking top Companies in Germany by annual revenue. The figures below are given in billions of Euro and are for the fiscal year 2021.

2019 Fortune list 
This list displays all 29 German companies in the Fortune Global 500, which ranks the world's largest companies by annual revenue. The figures below are given in millions of US dollars and are for the fiscal year 2018. Also listed are the headquarters location, net profit, number of employees worldwide and industry sector of each company.

2019 Forbes list 

This list is based on the Forbes Global 2000, which ranks the world's 2,000 largest publicly traded companies. The Forbes list takes into account a multitude of factors, including the revenue, net profit, total assets and market value of each company; each factor is given a weighted rank in terms of importance when considering the overall ranking. The table below also lists the headquarters location and industry sector of each company. The figures are in billions of US dollars and are for the year 2018. All 53 companies in the Forbes 2000 from Germany are listed.

References

See also
 List of the largest trading partners of Germany

Germany
companies